George Gale may refer to:

Politicians
George Gale (MP) (1490–1556), member of parliament for City of York
George Gale (congressman) (1756–1815), American politician

Law
George Alexander Gale (1906–1997), Canadian jurist
George Gale (Wisconsin politician) (1816–1868), American judge

Others
George Gale (aeronaut) (1797–1850), English stage performer and balloonist
George Washington Gale (1789–1861), priest and teacher
George Gale (journalist) (1927–1990), British journalist
George Gale (cartoonist) (1929–2003), British cartoonist
George Albert Gale (1893–1951), American artist, shipbuilder and sailor
Gales Brewery, George Gale and Co., English brewery

See also
George Gale House (disambiguation)